William Henry Abington (September 6, 1921 – January 4, 2014) was an American politician. He served in the Texas House of Representatives, representing Tarrant County, from 1949 to 1953. He was a Democrat. He was born in Childress, Texas and died at Austin, Texas. Abington was also active in the oil industry, serving as president of Texas Oil & Gas Association.

References

Democratic Party members of the Texas House of Representatives
1921 births
2014 deaths
People from Childress, Texas
People from Tarrant County, Texas